Grove Racing is an Australian motor racing team that's previously competed in various series, including the Porsche Carrera Cup Australia Championship and Super2 Series. The team is making its debut in the Supercars Championship in 2022. They will campaign two Ford Mustangs, driven by Lee Holdsworth and David Reynolds.

History

GT racing
Grove Racing was founded by businessman Stephen Grove in 2011 with a focus on racing Porsches in various categories. Having first competed in the Porsche Sprint Challenge Australia, the team entered the Porsche Carrera Cup Australia Championship in 2012 with Stephen as driver in the elite class. In 2014, the team won the first of its five Bathurst 12 Hour class victories.

Super2 Series
In 2018, Stephen's son Brenton entered the Super2 Series having also competed in Porsches. The team drafted two-time 24 Hours of Le Mans winner Earl Bamber to co-drive with Brenton at that year's Bathurst 250 endurance race for the series. The team did not continue in the series in 2019 with Brenton moving to drive for Triple Eight Race Engineering in the series.

In 2021, Matthew Payne entered the Super2 Series for the last two rounds in a Nissan Altima L33.

Supercars Championship
In January 2021, Grove Group purchased 50% of Kelly Racing, which was rebranded Kelly Grove Racing. Six months later, Grove bought out the remainder of the team, to be known as Grove Racing from 2022.

Supercars Results

Car No. 19 results

Car No. 26 results

Supercar drivers 

 David Reynolds (2022–present)
 Lee Holdsworth (2022)
 Matt Campbell (2022)
 Matthew Payne (2022–present)
 Garth Tander (2023)

Super2 drivers 

 Brenton Grove (2018)
 Earl Bamber (2018)
 Matthew Payne (2021–22)

Super2 Results

Car No. 10 results

GT3-Programme drivers
  Stephen Grove (2019–present)
  Brenton Grove (2019–present)
  Ben Barker (2019–present)
  Anton De Pasquale (2022–present)
  Earl Bamber (2023–present)

References

External links

Australian auto racing teams

2011 establishments in Australia
Porsche in motorsport
Auto racing teams established in 2011
Supercars Championship teams